The Order of the Immaculate Conception, abbreviated OIC and also known as the Conceptionists, is a Catholic religious order of Pontifical Right for women. For some years, they followed the Poor Clares Rule, but in 1511 they were recognized as a separate religious order, taking a new rule and the name of Order of the Immaculate Conception.

Origins 

The order was founded in 1484 in Toledo, Spain, by Beatrice of Silva, a noblewoman of Portugal and sister of the Franciscan friar, Blessed Amadeus. On the marriage of Princess Isabel of Portugal with King John II of Castile, Beatrice had accompanied the future Queen, her cousin, to the court of her new husband. After the marriage, however, her great beauty aroused the jealousy of the queen, for which she was imprisoned. During that time of incarceration, Beatrice experienced an apparition of the Blessed Virgin Mary, telling her that she wanted Beatrice to found a new Order in her honor.

Beatrice escaped with difficulty and took refuge in the Dominican covent at Toledo. There, for thirty-seven years, she led a life of holiness, however without becoming a member of that order. In 1484, Beatrice, with some companions, took possession of a convent in Toledo set apart for them by Isabella I of Castile.

In 1489, by permission of Pope Innocent VIII, the nuns adopted the Cistercian rule, bound themselves to the daily recitation of the Divine Office, and they were placed under obedience to the ordinary of the diocese. In 1501, Pope Alexander VI united this community with the Benedictine community of San Pedro de las Duenas, under the rule of St. Clare, but in 1511 Julius II gave it a rule of its own and put them under the protection of General Minister of Friars Minor, for this reason the nuns were called Franciscan Conceptionist. Special constitutions were drawn up for the Order in 1516 by Cardinal Francisco de Quiñones. It was the foundress, Beatrice of Silva, who chose the white habit, with a white scapular and blue mantle.

A second convent was founded in 1507 at Torrigo, from which, in turn, were established seven others. The order soon spread through Portugal, Spain, Italy, France; Spain's colony of New Spain (Mexico), starting in 1540 and as well as in Portugal's colony of Brazil. (That community, however, later separated to become a religious congregation of missionary sisters of the Third Order of St. Francis.)At its height there were some 2,000 cpmvemts of the order throughout the world. As of 2020, there were about 1,400 members in 127 houses.

The foundress, Beatrice of Silva, was canonized by Pope Paul VI in 1976. In 2019, Pope Francis gave his approval to the declaration of the martyrdom of Maria del Carmen and 13 companions, all Conceptionists, who were killed in Madrid in 1936 during the Spanish Civil War.

Going back to the roots

A major change in the interior life and spiritual orientation of the order developed at the end of the 20th century. The Second Vatican Council had instructed all religious institutes to go back to the inspirations and goals of their founders and to make sure that their current orientation and lifestyles of the communities were in keeping with these.

Through the studies done by Mercedes de Jesús Egido y Izquierdo (1935–2004), a new direction was developed and tried on an experimental basis at her convent. After a trial of two years, new constitutions were drawn up out the experience, which were submitted to Rome and approved by the Holy See in 1996 for this order, removing from it the noticeable Franciscan influence imposed upon it. Egido successfully argued that the foundress' vision was that of a life lived in imitation of the virtues of the Blessed Virgin Mary. She has become seen as a second foundress through her efforts. The process for seeking Egido's canonization was formally opened at the Monastery of the Immaculate Conception and St. Beatrice in Toledo on 8 November 2011.

See also 
 Mary of Jesus of Ágreda

References

External links 
 www.concepcionistas.info
 Website of the Conceptionist nuns of the Monastery of Alcázar de San Juan, Spain 

Catholic female orders and societies
1484 establishments in Europe
Poor Clares
Christian religious orders established in the 15th century